The Piranha IV is the fourth member of the Piranha family of armoured vehicles and is being developed as a private venture by the Swiss MOWAG corporation (since 2003 part of General Dynamics European Land Combat Systems).

BAE Systems Land Systems Weapons & Vehicles has also acquired a production licence.

References

Armoured fighting vehicles of the post–Cold War period
Wheeled infantry fighting vehicles
General Dynamics land vehicles
Armoured personnel carriers
Mowag Piranha